The 2019 Ukrainian Super Cup became the 16th edition of Ukrainian Super Cup, an annual season opener football match contested by the winners of the previous season's Ukrainian Top League and Ukrainian Cup competitions or the league's runner-up if the National Cup was won also by league champions.

Originally scheduled on 21 July 2019, the match was played at the Chornomorets Stadium, Odessa, on 28 July 2018 due to the Ukrainian parliamentary elections which were scheduled on 21st. The game was contested by league and cup winner Shakhtar Donetsk and league runner-up Dynamo Kyiv.

Preparations and other background events
The game will be broadcast on Futbol 1 of "Ukrayina" television channel. According to the UPL website, the stadium is expected to be full. The game for the first time will be shown at the Polish TVP Sport.

The main news for Shakhtar this summer became the arrival of new mentor. The Portuguese expert Luís Castro replaced at this post Paulo Fonseca who left for Rome. New contract with Dynamo was signed by Alyaksandr Khatskevich who has been the club's head coach for couple of seasons. It is expected that Oleksandr Karavayev a former graduate of the Shakhtar's academy will play for Dynamo.

The victory in the game is important for each team as well as their coaches. Castro wants to start his coaching career in Shakhtar with a win and a trophy, while Khatskevich wants to return his team a confidence and a win over its main opponent could become a better medicine for it.

In interview to the Dynamo's website, the Dynamo's defender Tamas Kadar said that "Everyone knows that the game with Shakhtar won't be easy. It is a great team with top notch players. But we have our own advantages. Uncompromising struggle awaits us, we give it all we can on the field. We want to please our fans and will do everything to win trophy."

In interview to the Shakhtar's website on the question what he expects from the new season, the Shakhtar's midfielder Manor Solomon said that he would like as in previous to take the championship gold and the Cup. "And also we set the task to successfully perform in the UEFA Champion's League by finishing at least the second in a group and advancing to play-offs. But the first goal is to win the Supercup. I want to invite fans of Shakhtar from all Ukraine come to the stadium and support us in the principle duel. We will be glad to see you!"

Previous encounters 

Before this game both teams met in the Ukrainian Super Cup eleven (11) times, the first being back in 2004. Before this game out of the previous eleven both teams won equally 3 games each, five more games were tied and led to penalty shootout three of which were won by Dynamo and two were won by Shakhtar.

Comparison table

Match

Details

References

2019
2019–20 in Ukrainian football
FC Dynamo Kyiv matches
FC Shakhtar Donetsk matches
Sport in Odesa
July 2019 sports events in Europe